Valspodar (PSC833) is an experimental cancer treatment and chemosensitizer.  It is a derivative of ciclosporin D (cyclosporin D).

Its primary use is as an inhibitor of the efflux transporter P-glycoprotein. Previous studies in animal models have found it to be effective at preventing cancer cell resistance to chemotherapeutics, but these findings did not translate to clinical success.

Adverse effects
Valspodar can cause nerve damage.

References

Experimental cancer drugs
Cyclic peptides